Lake Monomonac is an artificial lake that straddles the border between Rindge, New Hampshire, and Winchendon, Massachusetts, in the United States. It was created from a small pond in New Hampshire by the construction of dams on the North Branch of the Millers River, a part of the Connecticut River watershed.

The lake is classified as a warmwater fishery, with observed species including smallmouth and largemouth bass, black crappie, chain pickerel, white perch, pumpkinseed, bluegill, horned pout, and green sunfish.

See also

List of lakes in Massachusetts
List of lakes in New Hampshire

References

Lakes of Cheshire County, New Hampshire
Lakes of Worcester County, Massachusetts
Reservoirs in New Hampshire
Reservoirs in Massachusetts
Massachusetts placenames of Native American origin
New Hampshire placenames of Native American origin